Gerhard Günther Rodehau (born 6 July 1959 in Meißen, Saxony) is a retired East German hammer thrower.

Rodehau represented the sports club SC Einheit Dresden, and became East German champion in 1986 and 1990.

His personal best throw was 82.64 metres, achieved in August 1985 in Dresden. This ranks him fourth among German hammer throwers, behind Ralf Haber, Heinz Weis and Karsten Kobs.

International competitions

References

1959 births
Living people
People from Meissen
Sportspeople from Saxony
German male hammer throwers
East German male hammer throwers
Olympic athletes of East Germany
Athletes (track and field) at the 1988 Summer Olympics
World Athletics Championships athletes for East Germany
Dresdner SC athletes
Competitors at the 1986 Goodwill Games